Kim Ji-sung is a South Korean actress. She is known for her roles in dramas such as Mysterious Personal Shopper, Graceful Friends and How to Be Thirty. She also appeared in movies Coffee Mate, Park Hwa-young and The Way.

She debuted in 2016 as a contestant in Mnet's girl group survival show Produce 101.

Filmography

Television series

Web series

Television shows

Film

References

External links
 
 

1996 births
Living people
People from Hwaseong, Gyeonggi
21st-century South Korean actresses
South Korean female models
South Korean television actresses
South Korean film actresses
Produce 101 contestants